Dunja Eleonore Angelika Kreiser (born 27 June 1971 in Wolfenbüttel) is a German lawyer and politician of the Social Democratic Party (SPD) who has been serving as a member of the Bundestag since 2021.

Life
Before joining politics, Kreiser worked as a sewage supervisor for the city of Wolfenbüttel. From 1987 to 1990, Kreiser trained as a supply and waste disposal specialist. Kreiser worked as a wastewater master for the city of Wolfenbüttel until 2017 when she was elected in the state election to the Lower Saxony state parliament for the electoral district Wolfenbüttel-Nord.

Kreiser is married and has one child. She is a Protestant.

Political career
Dunja Kreiser stood as a direct candidate in the Salzgitter – Wolfenbüttel constituency in the 2021 federal election and stood in 12th place on the SPD state list. She won her constituency with 38.6% of the first-place votes. She then resigned her seat in the state parliament. Maximilian Schmidt succeeded her in the state parliament.

Kreiser is a full member of the Committee on the Interior and Home Affairs in the Bundestag. She is also a deputy member of the Sports Committee and the Economic Committee. 

In addition to her committee assignments, Kreiser chairs the German-Mexican Parliamentary Friendship Group.

See also 
 List of members of the 20th Bundestag

References

External links

 Website of Dunja Kreiser
 Biography at the German Bundestag
 State Parliament of Lower Saxony: Dunja Kreiser

Living people
1971 births
Members of the Landtag of Lower Saxony
Members of the Bundestag for Lower Saxony
21st-century German politicians
21st-century German women politicians
Female members of the Bundestag
Members of the Bundestag for the Social Democratic Party of Germany
Members of the Bundestag 2021–2025
German Protestants
People from Wolfenbüttel
Social Democratic Party of Germany politicians